Ain el Safssaf ( translit. ʿayn al-ṣafṣaf) (also Ain es-Sofsaf) is a village in the Matn District of the Mount Lebanon Governorate, Lebanon.

Overview

Etymology

Geography 
Elevation is approx.  above sea level.

Demographics
As of 2004, Ain el Safssaf houses a population of 902. Electorate includes 1165 voters.

References and footnotes

External links

Populated places in the Matn District
Maronite Christian communities in Lebanon
Melkite Christian communities in Lebanon